Pine Creek is a stream in Sauk County, Wisconsin, in the United States.

Pine Creek was named for the pine trees lining its banks.

See also
List of rivers of Wisconsin

References

Rivers of Sauk County, Wisconsin
Rivers of Wisconsin